Rafael Nadal defeated the two-time defending champion Kei Nishikori in the final, 6–4, 7–5 to win the singles title at the 2016 Barcelona Open. It was Nadal's record-extending ninth title at the Barcelona Open and his 49th clay court title, equaling Guillermo Vilas' record for the most titles on clay.

Seeds
All seeds receive a bye into the second round.

Draw

Finals

Top half

Section 1

Section 2

Bottom half

Section 3

Section 4

Qualifying

Seeds

Qualifiers

Lucky losers

Qualifying draw

First qualifier

Second qualifier

Third qualifier

Fourth qualifier

Fifth qualifier

Sixth qualifier

References

External links
 Main Draw
 Qualifying Draw

2016 ATP World Tour